Operation Reindeer, which took place on 4 May 1978, was South Africa's second major military operation in Angola during the South African Border War.

Operation Reindeer may also refer to:

Operation Rentier (Reindeer) was a German operation during World War II
Operation Poro (Reindeer), was a planned invasion of the north Scandinavian peninsula by the Soviets, during the 1930s